Uta Gerhardt (born 11 June 1938 in Zella-Mehlis, Germany) is a German sociologist and professor emeritus at the University of Heidelberg.
She studied sociology, philosophy and history at the universities of Frankfurt am Main and Berlin. In 1969, she obtained a Ph.D. at the University of Konstanz. The focus of her work is on medical sociology, structural-functionalist role theory, and general sociological theory. She also wrote a major biography of Talcott Parsons.

Uta Gerhardt is not to be confused with the feminist German sociologist Ute Gerhard.

Selected works

Books

Journal articles

External links
Personal homepage in German and English, with complete bibliography
Gerhardt's page at the University of Heidelberg (link not active as of 12 Sept 2013)

1938 births
Living people
People from Zella-Mehlis
German sociologists
Functionalism (social theory)
German women sociologists
Academic staff of Heidelberg University
Medical sociologists